Abdulaziz Al-Mandeel (born 22 May 1989) is a Kuwaiti athlete specializing in the high hurdles. He has won several medals at the regional level.

Competition record

Notes

References

1989 births
Living people
Kuwaiti male hurdlers
Asian Games competitors for Kuwait
Athletes (track and field) at the 2014 Asian Games
World Athletics Championships athletes for Kuwait
Asian Athletics Championships winners
Asian Indoor Athletics Championships winners